Joe E. Lewis (born Joseph Klewan; January 12, 1902 – June 4, 1971) was an American comedian, actor and singer.

Early life
Lewis was born to Russian Jewish immigrant parents on January 12, 1902 in New York City, New York.  He added the E. to distinguish himself from the boxer.  

Dropping out of De Witt Clinton High School after two years, the 15‐year‐old Lewis enlisted in the Marine Corps, but was found out and released.  He got into third‐rate burlesque and vaudeville in 1923.   

However, he made his breakthrough as a nightclub star in Chicago in the days of what he liked to call “the Great Drought,” Prohibition.  As portrayed in his 1957 biographic film, The Joker Is Wild, Lewis started out as a popular crooner in a gang-owned speakeasy during the prohibition years of the 1920s.

Biography
In Chicago in 1927, Lewis refused the request of Jack "Machine Gun" McGurn (an Al Capone lieutenant) to renew a contract that would have bound him to sing and perform at the Green Mill Cocktail Lounge, which was partly owned by Capone. After refusing, because he had been offered more money by a rival gang to appear at their own club, "The New Rendezvous", he was assaulted in his 10th floor Commonwealth Hotel room, on November 8, 1927, by three enforcers sent by McGurn. The enforcers, who included Sam Giancana and Leonard "Needles" Gianola, mutilated Lewis (his throat and tongue were cut) and left him for dead. It took him several years to be able to speak again.

Capone, who was fond of Lewis, was displeased with the assault, but would not take action against one of his top lieutenants. He instead provided Lewis with $10,000 (equal to $ today) to recover properly and eventually resume his career.

Lewis toured in the USO shows with Ray Bolger in the Pacific Theater during World War II. Joe appeared in the movies Too Many Husbands (the 1931 short comedy), Private Number (1936), The Holy Terror (1937), Private Buckaroo (1942), and (playing himself) Lady in Cement (1968). He appeared frequently on The Ed Sullivan Show, was the "Mystery Guest" three different times on What's My Line?, and was interviewed on Person to Person in 1956. In 1946 he married actress Martha Stewart; they divorced in 1948. Random House published Lewis's biography, The Joker Is Wild, written by Art Cohn, in 1955.

Lewis and Frank Sinatra had a longtime friendship predating Sinatra's portrayal of the comedian in The Joker Is Wild. In 1961 Sinatra signed Lewis to record for his label, Reprise Records. The result, It Is Now Post Time, is one of the first LPs released by Reprise, and one of the few recorded examples of Lewis at work as a stand-up comedian. The title references a well-known part of his act, holding up a drink on stage and saying “Post time!”. This is a horse racing term, meaning the race is about to start; its use here implies that the drinker is about to start on a long binge. On his live album Sinatra at the Sands (1966), Sinatra says that even though he recently celebrated his 50th birthday, he would have the body of a 22-year-old man, "if I hadn't spent all those years drinking with Joe E. Lewis."

Death
Lewis, who had been in a diabetic coma, died of a heart attack in 1971, aged 69, and was buried in Cedar Park Cemetery, Emerson, New Jersey.

Portrayal in film
In the film The Joker Is Wild (1957), Lewis was portrayed by Frank Sinatra.

Filmography
 The Big Show (1926) – Abie
 Private Number (1936) – Smiley Watson
 The Holy Terror (1937) – Pelican Beek
 Private Buckaroo (1942) – Lancelot Pringle McBiff
 Lady in Cement  (1968) – Himself (uncredited; final appearance)

References

Further reading

Joe E. Lewis quotes at brainyquote.com
USO Camp Shows at USO.org via Wayback Machine

External links

 
 

1902 births
1971 deaths
American stand-up comedians
Jewish American comedians
Jewish American male actors
Singers from New York City
Vaudeville performers
20th-century American singers
Burials at Cedar Park Cemetery (Emerson, New Jersey)
20th-century American comedians
20th-century American male singers
20th-century American Jews